Ho Teng-iat (born 1950 in Hangzhou, Zhejiang, China) is a Macau businesswoman and politician. She was a member of the Legislative Assembly of Macau. She is the daughter of Ho Tin, the founder of Sociedade Industrial Ho Tin S.A.R.L, and she acts as the managing director and CEO of her father's company. She is also the vice-president of Industrial Association of Macao.

References

External links
Ho Teng Iat (Chinese Version)

1950 births
Living people
Businesspeople from Hangzhou
Macau businesspeople
Macau women in politics
Members of the Legislative Assembly of Macau
Politicians from Hangzhou